Fyodor Alekseyevich Vidyayev (1912-1943) was a Soviet Navy submarine commander during World War II. He was killed in action in 1943.

Vidayev was born in Samara Oblast, he was an ethnic Mordvin. He finished high school in Murmansk in 1930 and graduated with distinction from the M.V. Frunze Higher Naval School in 1937. He joined the Northern Fleet submarine division and started as a junior navigator on the submarine D-2. In 1938 he took part in the rescue of four researchers from a drifting ice station. He took part in the Soviet Finnish War of 1939–40 blockading Petsamo.

In 1941 he was second in command of the submarine  serving under Nikolai Lunin. He was given command of this boat in 1942 when Lunin was given command of the new submarine . Vidayev carried out twelve war patrols. After the loss of ShCh-421 (scuttled at sea after mine damage) he commanded the sister ship ShCh-422. His boat set out in July 1943 and never returned.

References
This article is sourced from the Russian Wikipedia

1912 births
1943 deaths
People from Samara Oblast
Mordvin people
Soviet submarine commanders
Soviet military personnel killed in World War II
Officers of the Order of the British Empire
Recipients of the Order of the Red Banner
People who died at sea